Goluboye is a rural locality (a selo) in Kurgansky Selsoviet of Svobodnensky District, Amur Oblast, Russia. The population was 189 as of 2018. There are 7 streets.

Geography 
Goluboye is located on the Dzhatva River, 57 km north of Svobodny (the district's administrative centre) by road. Glukhari is the nearest rural locality.

References 

Rural localities in Svobodnensky District